David Linarès (born 5 October 1975) is a French football coach and a former midfielder.

Playing career
Linarès made his professional debut on 17 November 1996 against Lille. He won the French championship during the 2001–02 season while playing for Lyon.

Coaching career
He was hired as manager by Dijon in November 2020, with the club in last place in Ligue 1. Despite not being able to avoid relegation or even improve the table position, he remained the manager for the 2021–22 season. After only gaining 1 point in the first 5 games of the 2021–22 Ligue 2 season, he was dismissed by the club on 23 August 2021.

Managerial statistics

Personal life
Born in France, Linarès is of Spanish descent.

Honours
 Ligue 1: 2001–02
 UEFA Intertoto Cup: 1997

References

1975 births
Living people
French people of Spanish descent
People from Lons-le-Saunier
Sportspeople from Jura (department)
French footballers
Association football midfielders
Olympique Lyonnais players
ES Troyes AC players
CD Tenerife players
Dijon FCO players
Ligue 1 players
Ligue 2 players
Segunda División players
French expatriate footballers
French expatriate sportspeople in Spain
Expatriate footballers in Spain
French football managers
Dijon FCO managers
Ligue 1 managers
Ligue 2 managers
Footballers from Bourgogne-Franche-Comté